Jaan Kaplinski (22 January 1941 – 8 August 2021) was an Estonian poet, philosopher, politician, and culture critic, known for his focus on global issues and support for left-wing/liberal thinking. He was influenced by Eastern philosophical schools (Taoism and especially Buddhism).

He worked as a translator, editor, and sociologist and as an ecologist at the Tallinn Botanic Garden. He was nominated for the Nobel Prize in Literature.

Early life and education
Kaplinski was born 22 January 1941 in Tartu to Polish teacher Jerzy Kaplinski and Estonian dancer Nora Raudsepp-Kaplinski. He studied Romance language and linguistics at the University of Tartu, graduating as a French philologist in 1964.

Career

Kaplinski worked as a translator, editor, and sociologist, and ecologist at the Tallinn Botanic Garden.

Political career
From 1992 to 1995 Kaplinski was a member of the Riigikogu (the Estonian parliament).  He was originally a candidate on the Centre Party list, but soon became an independent representative. Since 2004 he was a member of the Estonian Social Democratic Party. In the 2005 local government elections, he ran in Tartu and was ESDP's first candidate in their list. Kaplinski was elected as the second Social Democrat candidate (Estonia uses an open list system in local elections), collecting 1,045 votes. Jaan Kaplinski was one of those intellectuals who supported Toomas Hendrik Ilves' candidature.

Personal life
Kaplinski's mother, Nora (Raudsepp), was Estonian. His father was Jerzy Bonifacy Edward Kaplinski, a Polish professor of philology at Tartu University, who was arrested by Soviet troops and died of starvation in a Soviet labour camp in 1945. His great-uncle was Polish painter and political activist Leon Kapliński. As an adult, Kaplinski came to believe that his father had distant Jewish ancestry, and was a relative of Jacob Frank.

Kaplinski was married to writer and director of the Tartu Toy Museum, Tiia Toomet. They had three sons and one daughter - Ott-Siim Toomet, Lauris Kaplinski, Lemmit Kaplinski and Elo-Mall Toomet. He had a daughter, translator Maarja Kaplinski, from his first marriage to Küllike Kaplinski. He later had a long-term relationship with Estonian classical philologist and translator Anne Lill, with whom he had a son, composer Märt-Matis Lill.

Writings

Kaplinski published numerous collections of poems, prose, and essays. He translated writings from French, English, Spanish, Chinese, including the Tao Te Ching, and Swedish, the work of Tomas Tranströmer.

Kaplinski's own work has been translated into English, Finnish, French, Norwegian, Swedish, Dutch, Icelandic, Hungarian, Japanese, Latvian, Lithuanian, Russian, Hebrew, Bulgarian, and Czech. His essays deal with environmental problems, philosophy of language, classical Chinese poems, philosophy, Buddhism, and Estonian nationalism.

Kaplinski also composed poems in English and Finnish. In the 2000s he began writing in Russian, and his first original Russian collection (composed of some of his poems translated from Estonian into Russian) appeared in 2014 under the title White Butterflies of Night (Белые бабочки ночи) and was awarded in Russia.

Kaplinski was one of the authors and initiators of the so-called Letter of 40 intellectuals (Neljakümne kiri) action. A letter signed by well-known Estonian intellectuals protesting against the behavior of the authorities in Soviet-annexed Estonia was sent to the main newspapers of the time. Although not openly dissident, the letter was never published in the press at that time and those who signed were repressed using administrative measures.

His semi-autobiographical novel The Same River is published by Peter Owen in English translation by Susan Wilson.

In 1997, he was awarded the Baltic Assembly Prize for Literature, the Arts and Science.

Poems
The East West Border...
The Same Sea in Us All (Barbarian Press, 1985) (translated by the author with Sam Hamill)
The Wandering Border (Copper Canyon Press, 1987) (translated by the author with Sam Hamill and Riina Tamm)
Evening Brings Everything Back (Bloodaxe, 2004)
Contributor to A New Divan: A Lyrical Dialogue between East and West (Gingko Library, 2019)

Legacy
Main-belt asteroid 29528 Kaplinski is named after Jaan Kaplinski.

References

External links
 Kaplinski's homepage, includes writings in English 
 Kaplinski's Russian-language poems
 Kaplinski's poems in French
 Jaan Kaplinski. Globalization: for nature or against nature 
 Jaan Kaplinski. From harem to brothel. Artists in the post-communist world 
 Lauri Sommer. Kaplinski's changing tale
 Wandering Border:: Poetry of Jaan Kaplinski by PGR Nair . https://web.archive.org/web/20170207192938/http://www.boloji.com/index.cfm?md=Content&sd=PoemArticle&PoemArticleID=95

1941 births
2021 deaths
Writers from Tartu
People from Tartu
Estonian people of Polish descent
Social Democratic Party (Estonia) politicians
Members of the Riigikogu, 1992–1995
Estonian philosophers
Estonian male poets
Translators from Swedish
Translators from Spanish
Translators from French
Translators from English
Translators from Chinese
Translators to Estonian
20th-century Estonian poets
21st-century Estonian poets
20th-century translators
21st-century translators
Hugo Treffner Gymnasium alumni
University of Tartu alumni
Recipients of the Eino Leino Prize
Recipients of the Order of the National Coat of Arms, 3rd Class
Recipients of the Order of the National Coat of Arms, 4th Class
Deaths from motor neuron disease
Neurological disease deaths in Estonia